The Queen Paola Foundation, founded in December 1992, is a Belgian non-profit organization. The foundation was created at the request of Princess Paola of Belgium. The aim of the foundation is to provide support to Belgian organizations which help young people facing problems with re-integration into society, and to support education. The foundation has established the School of Hope programme, in order to support schools located in disadvantaged neighbourhoods.

Queen Paola prize
The Queen Paola prize to primary education was created in 1997 in order to reward teachers who added value to their profession. Since 1998, the prize is awarded annually, alternating between primary and secondary school teachers.

See also
 King Baudouin Foundation
 Prince Albert Fund
 The Queen's Charities

Sources
 Queen Paola Foundation

External links
 Queen Paola Foundation

Educational foundations
Foundations based in Belgium
Organizations established in 1992
Organizations established in 1997